The Virgin and Child with Saint Anne or Madonna and Child with Saint Anne is a subject in Christian art showing Saint Anne with her daughter, the Virgin Mary, and her grandson Jesus. This depiction has been popular in Germany and neighboring countries since the 14th century.

Names
Names for this particular subject in other languages include: 
Dutch: Anna te Drieën 
French: Anne Trinitaire 
German: Anna Selbdritt 
Italian: Anna Metterza 
Slovene: Ana Samotretja

Background
In the 13th century, Jacobus de Voragine incorporated apocryphal accounts from the Protoevangelium of James regarding the parents of the Blessed Virgin Mary in his Golden Legend. The cult of St. Anne spread rapidly and she became one of the most popular saints of the Latin Church. Saint Anne was recognized as the patroness of grandparents, women in labor, and of miners, Christ being compared to gold, and Mary to silver. Inscriptions on some medieval church bells indicate that Saint Anne was invoked for protection against thunderstorms.

Mother and daughter
The subject of Saint Anne and the Virgin and Child was a popular subject in both painting and sculpture. This was due in part to its universality "—the love and tension between generations and also between humanity and the divine." The Anna Selbdritt style, popular in northern Germany in the 1500s, demonstrates the medieval focus on the humanity of Jesus. St. Anne's motherhood of Mary was viewed as mirroring Mary motherhood of Jesus. In 1497, the German Benedictine abbot Johannes Trithemius, in his De purissima et immaculate conception virginis Marie et de festivitate sancta Annematris eius linked the Immaculate Conception of Mary to the devotion to her mother. While the matter of the Immaculate Conception remained a subject of debate between philosophers and theologians, the depiction of Joachim and Anne Meeting at the Golden Gate was sometimes interpreted as a symbolic representation of the conception of Mary. Saint Anne was revered as the avia Christi ("grandmother of Christ"), matriarch of the Holy Kinship and exemplary mother.

Iconography

Fourteenth-century images of Saint Anne with the Virgin and Child were often modeled on the earlier seat of Wisdom motif. Mary was often shown as a much smaller figure than her mother. As devotion to St. Anne developed 14th century, sometimes a statue of the Madonna and Child was modified to include the additional figure of St. Anne. Anne's traditional colors are green and red, although often she is shown wearing the more sober colors of an older woman.

Depictions
Italian Renaissance painter Masaccio took up the subject around 1424. Leonardo da Vinci did an oil painting on this theme for the Church of Santissima Annunziata in Florence. Albrecht Dürer made an oil painting on wood around 1519 on the same subject. Bartholomäus Bruyn the Elder painted Virgin and Child with Saint Anne, Saint Gereon, and a Donor c. 1520.

Around 1606 Caravaggio undertook a commission from the Confraternity of Sant' Anna dei Palafrenieri. He depicted the Virgin and Child treading on the head of the serpent, observed by St. Anne, who was the patron saint of the Palafrenieri.

Gallery

Byzantine iconography
 Eastern depictions of the apocryphal narrative mimic the scriptural account of the annunciation of the Archangel Gabriel to Mary and take the form of a reclining Agios Joachim beside a double-vesicled fountain or well, implying Mary's perpetual virginity flows from the mystery of her Immaculate Conception in the womb of her mother Agia Anna in linear fashion conform with Eastern creedal statements on the procession of the Holy Spirit. Absent modern meteorology, and therefore the scientific knowledge of how surface water is replenished naturally by atmospheric moisture, the early Christian artist was limited by linear symbolism of gravity known in the topography of the region. Dewfall and the phenomenon of manna in the desert would have been known but revered as ineffable.

See also

 Coat of arms of Annaberg-Buchholz in the Saxony's Erzgebirge mountain range
 The Virgin and Child with St. Anne (Leonardo), c. 1503
 Virgin and Child with St. Anne (Masaccio), c. 1424

References

External links
Gallery

Virgin Mary in art
Saint Anne